Edward Curtiss (1898-1970) was an American film editor who worked in Hollywood from the 1920s through the 1960s.

Biography 
Curtiss was born in Los Angeles, California, to Frank Curtiss and Mabel West. He got his start in the film industry as a stuntman, and he had an aviator's license. He later transitioned into editing after impressing director Howard Hawks on set; he went on to edit a number of Hawks' films.

Selected filmography 

College Confidential (1960)
 The Mountain Road (1960)
 Ride a Crooked Trail (1958)
 The Thing That Couldn't Die (1958)
 Girls on the Loose (1958)
 Live Fast, Die Young (1958)
 Touch of Evil (1958)
 The Big Beat (1958)
 Man in the Shadow (1957)
 The Kettles on Old MacDonald's Farm (1957)
 The Tattered Dress (1957)
 Mister Cory (1957)
 Gun for a Coward (1957)
 The Unguarded Moment (1956)
 The Creature Walks Among Us (1956)
 Red Sundown (1956)
 The Kettles in the Ozarks (1956)
 Running Wild (1955)
 To Hell and Back (1955)
 Abbott and Costello Meet the Keystone Kops (1955)
 The Yellow Mountain (1954)
 The Black Shield of Falworth (1954)
 Dawn at Socorro (1954)
 Johnny Dark (1954)
 Ride Clear of Diablo (1954)
 All American (1953)
 The Great Sioux Uprising (1953)
 City Beneath the Sea (1953)
 The Mississippi Gambler (1953)
 Sally and Saint Anne (1952)
 Red Ball Express (1952)
 Bronco Buster (1952)
 The Strange Door (1951)
 Cave of Outlaws (1951)
 Little Egypt (1951)
 Comin' Round the Mountain (1951)
 The Prince Who Was a Thief (1951)
 The Fat Man (1951)
 Winchester '73 (1950)
 Outside the Wall (1950)
 The Story of Molly X (1949)
 Abandoned (1949)
 Abbott and Costello Meet the Killer, Boris Karloff (1949)
 Calamity Jane and Sam Bass (1949)
 Illegal Entry (1949)
 The Countess of Monte Cristo (1948)
 Feudin', Fussin' and A-Fightin' (1948)
 Casbah (1948)
 Brute Force (1947)
 Buck Privates Come Home (1947)
 Swell Guy (1946)
 Her Adventurous Night (1946)
 Blonde Alibi (1946)
 Tangier (1946)
 Pillow of Death (1945)
 Shady Lady (1945)
 The Woman in Green (1945)
 Renegades of the Rio Grande (1945)
 Swing Out, Sister (1945)
 Frisco Sal (1945)
 Hi, Beautiful (1944)
 The Singing Sheriff (1944)
 Pardon My Rhythm (1944)
 Week-End Pass (1944)
 Swingtime Johnny (1943)
 Corvette K-225 (1943)
 Good Morning, Judge (1943)
 Frankenstein Meets the Wolf Man (1943)
 Mug Town (1942)
 Strictly in the Groove (1942)
 Sin Town (1942)
 Invisible Agent (1942)
 Almost Married (1942)
 Saboteur (1942)
 Unseen Enemy (1942)
 Paris Calling (1941)
 This Woman Is Mine (1941)
 Law of the Range (1941)
 Mutiny in the Arctic (1941)
 The Lady from Cheyenne (1941)
 Six Lessons from Madame La Zonga (1941)
 Lucky Devils (1941)
 Trail of the Vigilantes (1940)
 Law and Order (1940)
 When the Daltons Rode (1940)
 Hot Steel (1940)
 Ski Patrol (1940)
 Ma! He's Making Eyes at Me (1940)
 My Little Chickadee (1940)
 Tower of London (1939)
 One Hour to Live (1939)
 I Stole a Million (1939)
 Exile Express (1939)
 Secrets of a Nurse (1938)
 Swing That Cheer (1938)
 Freshman Year (1938)
 Come and Get It (1936)
 The Road to Glory (1936)
 Barbary Coast (1935)
 The Mystery of Edwin Drood (1935)
 Strange Wives (1934)
 Great Expectations (1934)
 Romance in the Rain (1934)
 I Give My Love (1934)
 Affairs of a Gentleman (1934)
 Uncertain Lady (1934)
 Today We Live (1933)
 The Bitter Tea of General Yen (1932)
 Scarface (1932)
 The Good Bad Girl (1931)
 The Fighting Sheriff (1931)
 The Criminal Code (1930)
 The Love Trap (1929)
 The Snarl of Hate (1927)
 The Phantom of the Opera (1925)
 The Hunchback of Notre Dame (1923)

References 

1898 births
1970 deaths
American film editors
People from Los Angeles